Hobarrow Bay is a small secluded southwest-facing bay, with an oil shale and shingle beach to the southeast of Brandy Bay and to the southwest of Kimmeridge on the south coast of the Isle of Purbeck, in Dorset, England.

Location 
It is part of the Jurassic Coast.

Access to Hobarrow Bay is possible solely by foot from the South West Coast Path via Kimmeridge, but admission to the Bay is prohibited. The area around the Bay is owned by the Ministry of Defence (MoD). Lulworth Ranges are part of the Armoured Fighting Vehicles Gunnery School. Because tanks and armoured vehicles are used in this area, safety warnings about explosives and unexploded shells are posted around the area by the MoD, and visitors are advised to keep to official footpaths and abide by local site notices.

See also 
 List of Dorset beaches

References

Isle of Purbeck
Bays of Dorset
Jurassic Coast